A conflict atlas, also called conflict partiture, is a graphical representation of the development of a particular conflict. The graph shows important events, appointments, and their interlinkage over time. 

This instrument has been mentioned in F. Glasl's book Konfliktmanagement (2004).

See also
Conflict management

Conflict (process)
Graphic design